Metaculus is an American reputation-based, massive online prediction solicitation and aggregation engine. One of the focuses of Metaculus is predicting the timing, nature and impact of scientific and technological advances and breakthroughs.

Reward system
Three types of predictions can be made: probability predictions to binary questions that resolve as either 'yes' or 'no', numerical-range predictions, and date-range predictions. Users can contribute to the community prediction for any given question, leave comments and discuss prediction strategies with other users. Users can suggest new questions which, after moderation, will be opened to the community.

Users can earn points for successful predictions (or lose points for unsuccessful predictions), and track their own predictive progress. The scoring awards points both for being right and for being more right than the community.

In January 2020, Metaculus introduced the Bentham Prize, which awards bi-weekly monetary prizes of $300, $200 and $100 to the first, second and third most valuable user contributions. The following month, Metaculus introduced the Li Wenliang prize, which awards a number of different monetary prizes to questions, forecasts and analyses related to the COVID-19 outbreak.

History
Data scientist Max Wainwright and physicists Greg Laughlin and Anthony Aguirre launched the site in 2015.

In June 2017, the Metaculus Prediction was launched, which is a system for aggregating user's predictions.
The Metaculus Prediction, on average, outperforms the median of the community's predictions when evaluated using the Brier or Log scoring rules.

See also 

 PredictIt
 Prediction market
 Futarchy

References

External links 
Metaculus website

Predictive analytics
Prediction markets
Organizations associated with effective altruism